This is a list of newspapers in Nauru.

Bulletin
Central Star News
The Nauru Chronicle

See also
List of newspapers
Media of Nauru

References

Nauru
Newspapers

Newspapers